Gmina Rudna is a rural gmina (administrative district) in Lubin County, Lower Silesian Voivodeship, in south-western Poland.

Neighbouring gminas
Gmina Rudna is bordered by the gminas of Grębocice, Jemielno, Lubin, Niechlów, Pęcław, Polkowice, Ścinawa and Wińsko.

Villages
The gmina contains the villages of Brodów, Brodowice, Bytków, Chełm, Chobienia, Ciechłowice, Gawronki, Gawrony, Górzyn, Gwizdanów, Juszowice, Kębłów, Kliszów, Koźlice, Miłogoszcz, Mleczno, Naroczyce, Nieszczyce, Olszany, Orsk, Radomiłów, Radoszyce, Rudna, Rudna-Leśna, Rynarcice, Stara Rudna, Studzionki, Toszowice, Wądroże and Wysokie.

Twin towns – sister cities

Gmina Rudna is twinned with:
 Oybin, Germany

References

Rudna
Lubin County